Irish Crystal is the ninth of the Nuala Anne McGrail series of mystery novels by Roman Catholic priest and author Father Andrew M. Greeley.

2006 American novels

Nuala Anne McGrail series
Novels by Andrew M. Greeley
Forge Books books